Fuerte is the seventh studio album by Argentine band Miranda!, released on April 21, 2017, through Sony Music, the band's first record with the label, after leaving Pelo Music in 2016. It was entirely produced and written by Alejandro Sergi and Cachorro López. Guest vocals include Uruguayan Natalia Oreiro and Mexican Jesús Navarro, part of the band Reik.

Background and release 
The creation of the album began in 2016, while the band's second compilation album, El Templo del Pop, Vol. 2, was being released, after leaving Pelo Music and signing with the Sony Music label.

"743" was released as the lead single on November 11, 2016. The second single, "Quiero Vivir A Tu Lado", released on January 24, 2017, was composed to be the theme song for the series of the same name, starring Mike Amigorena, Paola Krum, Florencia Peña and Alberto Ajaka.

In 2017 "En Esta Noche", "Enero" and "Cálido y Rojo" were released as singles. The latter had a remix released in 2020 together with the Argentine singer Benjamín Amadeo. "Tu Padre" was released as the last single on June 7, 2018.

Lyrics and composition 
Fuerte is primarily a pop record, with elements from various musical styles, such as electropop, synth-pop, Argentine rock, funk and disco. Alejandro Sergi described it as a more relaxed dance album, compared to the band's previous ones, such as El Disco de Tu Corazón and Miranda Es Imposible!.

Accolades

Track listing 
All songs written and produced by Alejandro Sergi and Cachorro López, except where noted.

Credits and personnel 
Adapted from the album liner notes.
 Alejandro Sergi – lead vocals, production, composition, keyboards, guitar, programming
 Juliana Gattas – lead vocals
 Cachorro López – bass (1, 5, 6), keyboards (1, 2, 4, 5, 6, 10, 11), programming (1, 2, 4, 5, 6, 10, 11)
 Natalia Oreiro – lead vocals (9)
 Jesús Navarro – lead vocals (7).
 Sebastián Schon – programming (1, 2, 4, 6, 7, 10, 11, 12), sax (10)
 Gabriel Lucena – keyboards (2, 3), programming (2, 3), guitar (2), bass (3)
 Anuk Sforza – guitar (2, 3, 7, 11, 12)
 Ludo Morell – drums (2, 3, 11, 12)
 Demián Nava – keyboards (1, 4, 10), programming (1, 4, 10)
 Didi Gutman – keyboards (4, 7)
 Nicolás Grimaldi – bass (7, 11, 12), locution (1)
 Demir Lulja – violin (7)
 César Sogbe – mixing
 Brad Blackwood – mastering

References 

2017 albums
Spanish-language albums
Miranda! albums
Albums produced by Cachorro López